Tejan Amadu Mansaray is a Sierra Leonean politician. He is a member of the All People's Congress party and is one of the representatives in the Parliament of Sierra Leone for Koinadugu District, elected in 2002.

References

Members of the Parliament of Sierra Leone
Year of birth missing (living people)
Living people
All People's Congress politicians
Place of birth missing (living people)